Linguang station (formerly transliterated as Linkuang Station until 2003) is a station on the Brown Line of the Taipei Metro, located on the border of Taipei, Taiwan.

Station overview
 
The three-level, elevated station has two side platforms, and a single exit.

Station layout

Exits
Single Exit: On Heping East Rd.

Around the station
Coastal Patrol Directorate General
Linguang New Community
Fuyang Natural Ecological Park
Fuzhoushan Park
Lizhong Park

References

Railway stations opened in 1996
Wenhu line stations